Hornby-with-Farleton is a civil parish in Lancaster, Lancashire, England. It contains 37 listed buildings that are recorded in the National Heritage List for England.  Of these, two are listed at Grade I, the highest of the three grades, one is at Grade II*, the middle grade, and the others are at Grade II, the lowest grade.

The parish contains the village of Hornby and the smaller settlement of Farleton, and is otherwise rural.  Most of the listed buildings are in Main Street, Hornby, and a high proportion of these are houses.  The major building in the parish is the country house of Hornby Castle; this and associated structures are listed.  The River Wenning passes through the parish, and the bridge crossing it is listed.  Other listed buildings include a cross and three cross bases, two churches and associated structures, a public house, a hotel, a village institute, a drinking fountain, a toll house, a former police station, and three milestones.

Key

Buildings

References

Citations

Sources

Lists of listed buildings in Lancashire
Buildings and structures in the City of Lancaster